Pseudomeritastis emphanes is a species of moth of the family Tortricidae. It is found in Pichincha Province, Ecuador.

The wingspan is about 18 mm. The ground colour of the forewings is creamy white, grey in the costal third and darker basally and apically, with a few brown-grey dashes. The hindwings are creamy, slightly tinged ochreous at the apex.

Etymology
The species name refers to the distinct genital characters and is derived from the Greek emphanes (meaning visible).

References

Moths described in 2004
Euliini